The BAR 007  was a Formula One car used by British American Racing in the 2005 Formula One season. The car was driven by Jenson Button and Takuma Sato, although Sato was replaced by Anthony Davidson for the Malaysian Grand Prix as he had the flu. The team's test driver was Enrique Bernoldi along with Davidson.

The team had a poor start to the season, and were involved in controversy over the minimum weight of their cars (see below), and were disqualified from one race, banned from another two, and also did not start in Indianapolis due to use of Michelin tyres. The team failed to score a point until the French Grand Prix.  However, the team's fortunes were turning slightly, and Jenson Button scored points in all of the last 10 races, including two podium finishes. Takuma Sato only scored one point in the entire season and was subsequently sacked from the team.

BAR used 'Lucky Strike' logos in all other competitions except Canadian, United States, French, British, Hungarian, Turkish, Italy, and Belgian and '555' logos in China. In China all team members and drivers used blue-yellow overalls and clothing throughout the weekend.

Design and history 
The 007 was a clear evolution of the BAR 006, which had been highly successful for the team, leading to their second place in the 2004 championship behind Ferrari.  The new 007 car was a much tighter design and overall it was smaller than the previous 006.  BAR designers also managed to save significant weight over the 006 car, despite greater safety testing being required for the 2005 season.

The engine and gearbox were not left untouched either. For the 2005 season, engines had to last 2 races. Honda created a brand new V10 unit, which was smaller, lighter, and had a better centre of gravity than the 2004 engine. The gearbox was also an evolution of the 2004 unit, with some modifications to allow it to fit in better with the new tight design. Halfway through the 2005 season, BAR introduced a multi-profile front wing.

At the end of the 2005 season, Honda, the engine partner since 2000, secured 100% team ownership, purchasing it from British American Tobacco, the long term sponsor of the team. The cars would remain with the BAT sponsorship throughout 2006.

The BAR 007 was also the first Formula One car to use a seamless-shift gearbox.

Controversy 
Both BAR-Hondas were disqualified from the San Marino Grand Prix after it was found the cars could run below the minimum weight, stated by the FIA regulations of 605 kg. BAR disagreed with the report, claiming the cars could not run with less than 6 kg of fuel, therefore that pushed them over the minimum weight.  They also claimed that they thought it was during race weight the rules meant, not in post-race scrutineering. The FIA decided to punish the team, banning them from two races, including the Monaco Grand Prix. Jenson Button acted as a summariser for ITV F1 in the Monaco Grand Prix, as he could not compete. BAR were going to contest the disqualification, but later changed their minds. Max Mosley wanted to have the team disqualified from the entire season.

Following the controversy, the team also did not start the United States Grand Prix as the team was asked by tyre supplier Michelin to withdraw from the race due to tyre problems affecting all Michelin-based teams; BAR had not scored a point at this point.

Speed record attempt
In July 2006, Honda used the car to achieve a top speed of 397.481 km/h (246.983 mph) at the Bonneville Salt Flats. Driving the car was test driver and former Formula One medical car driver Alan van der Merwe.

Gallery

Complete Formula One results
(key) (results in bold indicate pole position, results in italics indicate fastest lap)

References

2005 Formula One season cars
BAR Formula One cars
Formula One controversies